Transplant glomerulopathy (TG) is a disease of the glomeruli in transplanted kidneys. It is a type of renal injury often associated with chronic antibody-mediated rejection. However, transplant glomerulopathy is not specific for chronic antibody-mediated rejection; it may be the result of a number of disease processes affecting the glomerular endothelium.


Pathology
It is characterized by glomerular basement membrane thickening (referred to as tram-tracking of the basement membrane), increased mesangial matrix and segmental and global glomerulosclerosis.

The differential diagnosis of tram-tracking includes membranoproliferative glomerulonephritis (especially hepatitis C), and thrombotic microangiopathies.

See also
 Kidney transplant
 Chronic rejection

References

Kidney diseases